In computing, an X terminal is a display/input terminal for X Window System client applications. X terminals enjoyed a period of popularity in the early 1990s when they offered a lower total cost of ownership alternative to a full Unix workstation.

An X terminal runs an 'X server'. In X, the usage of "client" and "server" is from the viewpoint of the programs: the X server supplies a screen, keyboard, mouse and touchscreen to client applications. This connects to an X display manager (introduced in X11R3) running on a central machine, using XDMCP (X Display Manager Control Protocol, introduced in X11R4).

Thin clients have somewhat supplanted X terminals in that they are equipped with added flash memory and software for communication with remote desktop protocols.

Vendors
In the early 1990s, several vendors introduced X terminals including HP, DEC (including the VT1000 series), IBM, Samsung, NCD, Gipsi and Tektronix.

See also 
 Blit (computer terminal)
 Thin client

References 

Thin clients
X Window System